is a Japanese manga series by Shohei Harumoto. It was adapted into a live action film in 2012.

Cast
 Claude Maki - Kirin

References

External links
 

1987 manga
Live-action films based on manga
Manga adapted into films
Seinen manga
Shōnen Gahōsha manga
Japanese drama films